Between 1938 and 1944, Glenn Miller and His Orchestra released 266 singles on the monaural ten-inch shellac 78 rpm format. Their studio output comprised a variety of musical styles inside of the Swing genre, including ballads, band chants, dance instrumentals, novelty tracks, songs adapted from motion pictures, and, as the Second World War approached, patriotic music.

Non-instrumental songs featured Miller's various vocalists, generally Ray Eberle or Marion Hutton before 1940, with Tex Beneke, vocal group The Modernaires, and Skip Nelson all making studio vocal appearances after the turn of the decade. Beginning with An Album of Outstanding Arrangements in 1945, this collection has been repackaged into various album formats over time with release on 78 rpm, 10 and 12 inch LP, 7 inch 45 rpm, compact cassette, 8-track, compact disc (CD), and digital formats.

Before his popularity, in the late 1920s, Miller played or wrote arrangements for many hot jazz groups, including a stint as a trombonist-arranger for Red Nichols’ famed Five Pennies recordings.

Charted singles and selected discography, 1938–1942
Chart is sorted by order of individual song debut date.

Other discographical highlights, radio format

 "Sold American" – written by Glenn Miller and Chummy MacGregor, was first recorded on May 23, 1938, as part of the first session for the new, reformed Glenn Miller Orchestra on Brunswick. When Miller signed with Victor he recorded "Sold American" again on June 27, 1939.
 "The Rhumba Jumps!" – Vocal by Marion Hutton and Tex Beneke.
 "Sometime" – vocal by Ray Eberle, composed by Glenn Miller and Chummy MacGregor in 1939, the song was only performed for radio broadcast; published in 1940 with lyrics credited to Mitchell Parish
 "Long Tall Mama" – written by Billy May under his first wife's name, "Arletta May".
 "Measure for Measure" – written by Billy May, recording exists from Sun Valley Serenade sound-on-film sessions.
 "Daisy Mae" – written by Billy May with Hal McIntyre
 "Gabby Goose" – written by Billy May
 "Swinging at the Seance" - composed by Edward Stone whose real name was Abie Steinfeld. The song was covered by The Moon-Rays in 2008, and the Deep River Boys in 2009.
 "Yester Thoughts" – vocal by Ray Eberle.
 "Flag Waver" - written by Jerry Gray.
 "A Love Song Hasn't Been Sung" - written by Jerry Gray, Bill Conway, and Harold Dickinson.
 "Are You Rusty, Gate?" – written by Jerry Gray.
 "Introduction to a Waltz" – instrumental composed by Glenn Miller, Jerry Gray, and Hal Dickinson and performed for radio broadcast only.
 "The Man in the Moon" – Vocal by Ray Eberle. Written by Jerry Gray, Jerry Lawrence, and John Benson Brooks and recorded on September 3, 1941.
 "Solid as a Stonewall, Jackson" – written by Chummy MacGregor and Jerry Gray
 "Stardust" by Hoagy Carmicheal and Mitchell Parish. Recorded January 29, 1940 for Bluebird.
 "Delilah" – Vocal by Tex Beneke and the Modernaires.
 "Sentimental Me" – Vocal by Dorothy Claire.
 "Ida! Sweet As Apple Cider" – Vocal by Tex Beneke; Recorded January 17, 1941. Written by Eddie Leonard. Two recordings exist, one a test pressing. Arranged by Billy May.
 "Down for the Count" - written by Bill Finegan, performed over broadcast.
 "Conversation Piece" - written by Bill Finegan, performed over broadcast.
 "Tiger Rag" – composed by Nick LaRocca.
 "Slumber Song" – written by Chummy MacGregor and Saul Tepper. It was used as Glenn Miller's theme song in 1941 when contractual problems with ASCAP forbade him from using "Moonlight Serenade".
 "The Spirit is Willing" – written by Jerry Gray. Recorded for the soundtrack, but not used for Sun Valley Serenade. Audio still survives and has been reissued several times. Issued on 78 as Bluebird B-11135-A.
 "Helpless" – written by Glenn Miller Orchestra; guitarist and vocalist Jack Lathrop
 "Long Time No See, Baby" – Vocal by Marion Hutton – Jack Lathrop & Sunny Skylar (w&m)
 "Keep 'Em Flying" – written by Jerry Gray. Glenn Miller changed the song title from "That's Where I Came In" to "Keep 'Em Flying". Recorded December 8, 1941.
 "Oh! So Good" – written by Jerry Gray
 "Soldier, Let Me Read Your Letter" – arranged by arranger/trumpeter Billy May; written by Sidney Lippman, Pvt. Pat Fallon and Pvt. Tim Pasma
 "I Got Rhythm" – Billy May, arranger /January 1, 1942 broadcast 
 "Boom Shot" – composed by Glenn Miller and Billy May (under his wife's name Arletta May) for Orchestra Wives and arranged by George Williams.
 "Blues in the Night"
 "When Johnny Comes Marching Home"
 "Rainbow Rhapsody"
 "Polka Dots and Moonbeams"
 "Make Believe"
 "Twenty Four Robbers"
 "On A Little Street in Singapore"

Harry Warren and Mack Gordon songs for Sun Valley Serenade and Orchestra Wives:
Harry Warren and Mack Gordon were songwriters under contract with Twentieth Century Fox from 1940 to 1943. During that time period they composed the songs for Miller's movies for Fox.

 "The Kiss Polka", used in Sun Valley Serenade and also appeared as a Bluebird 78.
 "The World is Waiting to Waltz Again" – vocal by John Payne, cut out of the release print of Sun Valley Serenade.
 "People Like You and Me" – Vocals by Marion Hutton, Tex Beneke, Ray Eberle, and the Modernaires in Orchestra Wives. Not recorded commercially or performed for broadcast.
 "That's Sabotage" – vocal by Marion Hutton. Cut out of the release print of Orchestra Wives supposedly by pressure from the United States government about how the war effort was being presented in the song. The 35mm audio survives and has been released many times. Also recorded with Marion Hutton for RCA Victor.

Radio format:
In sharing air time with the Andrews Sisters for the early Chesterfield Shows, the Miller band had nine minutes to present its music. Miller instituted medleys of Something Old, Something New, Something Borrowed, Something Blue into the band's broadcasts to enable it to play as much as possible. This medley tradition continued into both later programs and the Army Air Force band's radio broadcasts.

Sample Glenn Miller medley, June 19, 1940, Cincinnati, Ohio, Chesterfield show with a Jerry Gray arrangement of all tracks:

Old – "The Touch of Your Hand" (Generally an older song)

New – "Basket Weaver Man" (A way to introduce a new song, written by Joe McCarthy and Walter Donaldson)

Borrowed – "The Waltz You Saved For Me" (Themes or songs made famous by other bands/bandleaders; Borrowed from bandleader Wayne King, written by King, Gus Kahn and Emil Flindt)

Blue – "Blue Danube" ("Blue" in title, written by Johann Strauss Jr., 1867)

Recordings as sideman, arranger, and leader: 1926–1938
The first authenticated recordings made by Glenn Miller were in 1926. In the fall of 1926, Earl Baker, a cornetist, made recordings on cylinders using the Edison Standard Phonograph recording device, making the first recordings of Glenn Miller, Benny Goodman, and Fud Livingston. Miller and Goodman were both in the Ben Pollack and his Californians band at that time. The Ben Pollack band was in Chicago, Illinois, to make studio recordings for Victor. The Baker cylinders are available on the album "The Legendary Earl Baker Cylinders", released by the Jazz Archives record label as JA43 in 1979. The songs performed included "Sleepy Time Gal", "Sister Kate", "After I Say I'm Sorry", and "Sobbin' Blues".

 "When I First Met Mary" – recorded on December 9, 1926, in Chicago as part of Ben Pollack and his Californians which featured Benny Goodman on clarinet. The recording was released as Victor 20394.
 "He's the Last Word" – recorded on December 12, 1926, with Ben Pollack and featuring a solo by Benny Goodman
 "Room 1411 (Goin' to Town)" – Miller's first known composition, written with Benny Goodman in 1928 and recorded with Miller's peers was released on 78 as Brunswick 4013.
 "Solo Hop" – composed by Glenn Miller in 1935 when he began recording under his own name which features a trumpet solo by Bunny Berigan. The record reached number seven on the Billboard singles chart in 1935 becoming Miller's first hit record.
 "Dese Dem Dose" – with the Dorsey Brothers and Ray Noble.
 "When Icky Morgan Plays the Organ" – recorded with the Clark Randall Orchestra in 1935. Clark Randall was the pseudonym of Frank Tennille, the father of Toni Tennille of the Captain and Tennille. Most of the band members in the Clark Randall Orchestra were part of the Bob Crosby Orchestra.
 "Annie's Cousin Fanny" – with the Dorsey Brothers in 1934, vocal by Kay Weber and orchestra. This song was covered by Dick Pierce, Russ Carlton and his Orchestra, Marshall Royal and Maxwell Davis on the album Studio Cuts which includes two takes of the song and in 2000 by Mora's Modern Rhythmists Dance Orchestra, a ten-piece ensemble that plays jazz and swing from the 1920s and 1930s. The record was banned by radio stations in 1934 because of suggestive lyrics relying on double entendre.
 "Every Day's a Holiday" was a 1938 Brunswick 78 single by Glenn Miller and his Orchestra that reached number 17 on Billboard, staying on the charts for one week. This was Glenn Miller's second hit record before he switched to the Bluebird label.
 "Doin' the Jive"
 "Community Swing"

Pre-1938 charted recordings

Army Air Force Band (Glenn Miller Army Air Forces Orchestra) and V-Discs: 1943–1944

Navy V-Discs featured different color schemes than standard V-Discs.

Unreleased V-Discs and addendum

Other popular tracks, not recorded for or unreleased as V-Discs were:

 "7-0-5" or "Seven-O-Five" – written by Glenn Miller. While recorded for V-Disc, it went unreleased.
 "Passage Interdit" - written by Jerry Gray. Released as V-Disc 587A in February, 1946.
 "Snafu Jump" – written by Jerry Gray
 "Long Ago (And Far Away)" vocal Johnny Desmond / Norman Leyden, arranger March 25, 1944, broadcast
 "People Will Say We're In Love" vocal Johnny Desmond / Norman Leyden, arranger
 "Flying Home", written by Benny Goodman, Eddie DeLange, and Lionel Hampton; arranged by Steve Steck; April 8, 1944, broadcast
 "Mission to Moscow" - Mel Powell, composer and arranger

Songs that were in the civilian band and Army Air Force band libraries include:
 "Jeep Jockey Jump" – written by Jerry Gray and one broadcast of the song was done by the civilian band.
 "It Must Be Jelly ('Cause Jam Don't Shake Like That)" – music written by Chummy MacGregor and George Williams and lyrics by Sunny Skylar. George Williams, arranger /Mar. 11, 1944 Chant by the band. This version is from the Army Air Force band. The civilian band played the same arrangement that was performed at least twice, available on a Victor 78 recording, Vi-20-1546-A, recorded July 15, 1942  or also taken from a radio remote broadcast from September 15, 1942, in Boston, Massachusetts  and later re-released by RCA Victor on LPT 6700. According to the tsort.com website, the 78 single, Victor 20–1546, reached number twelve on the Billboard charts in January, 1944, where it stayed for eight weeks on the chart. Moreover, the record was a crossover hit, reaching number two on the Billboard 'Harlem' Hit Parade Chart on February 19, 1944, the then equivalent of the later R&B chart, and number sixteen on the Billboard Juke Box Chart. Harry James, Johnny Long, and Frankie Ford also recorded versions. Woody Herman recorded a version that was also released as a V-Disc, No. 320B, in November, 1944.
 "Sun Valley Jump" – written by Jerry Gray. Released as a V-Disc, No. 281A, on October, 1944 by Glenn Miller and the AAFTC Orchestra.
 "Rhapsody in Blue" – written by George Gershwin. The civilian band version has Bobby Hackett solo in the middle. "Rhapsody in Blue" from the civilian band is not the entire work, but rather a section of the work arranged to fit on a 10" 78 rpm record. It was released as Victor 20-1529-A.
 "Blue Rain" – written by Johnny Mercer and Jimmy Van Heusen, Civilian band-arrangement with Ray Eberle vocal, unknown arranger. Army Air Force band: arrangement with strings, no vocal.
 "Are You Jumpin' Jack?" – written by Bill Finegan. First civilian band version, December 21, 1940, for a remote broadcast on NBC.
 " Enlisted Men's Mess" – written by Jerry Gray. In the civilian band's library but not performed or recorded. Performed by the Army Air Forces Training Command Band and broadcast on the I Sustain the Wings radio program, May 5, 1944.

Songs that were prepared for but went unreleased on V-Disc include:
 "Stardust" (breakdown)
 "(The End Of A) Perfect Day"
 "Blue Room"
 "Holiday for Strings", in two parts
 "Here We Go Again"
 "In An Eighteenth Century Drawing Room"
 "The Old Refrain"
 "Song Of The Volga Boatmen"
 "Moonlight Serenade" (AAF arrangement)

A disc released in 2010 is called "The Final - His Last Recordings" and collects Miller's last known recorded performances (November, 1944) plus bonus spoken bits for the radio program "Music for the Wehrmacht", starring Major Miller with German speaker Ilse Weinberger. The album also contains a September 1944 interview and - as final track - the BBC radio announcement of Miller's disappearance.

Album discography, 1928–1944

References

Bibliography
 Polic, Edward F. (1990). The Glenn Miller Army Air Force Band. The Scarecrow Press, Inc.; Sustineo Alas/I Sustain the Wings edition (June 1, 1990) 

 Miller, Glenn (1943). Glenn Miller's Method for Orchestral Arranging. New York: Mutual Music Society. ASIN: B0007DMEDQ
 Miller, Glenn (1927). Glenn Miller's 125 Jazz Breaks For Trombone. Chicago: Melrose Brothers Music Company.
 Miller, Glenn (1939). Feist All-Star Series of Modern Rhythm Choruses Arranged By Glenn Miller For Trombone. New York: Leo J. Feist, Inc.
 Grudens, Richard (2004). Chattanooga Choo Choo: The Life and Times of the World Famous Glenn Miller Orchestra. Stony Brook, NY: Celebrity Profiles, 2004. 
 Sears, Richard S. (1980). V-Discs: A History and Discography. Greenwood Press; illustrated edition (December 23, 1980) 

 
Discographies of American artists
Jazz discographies